Masala Padam is a 2015 Indian Tamil-language action comedy film directed, filmed and co-produced by cinematographer Laxman Kumar along with Vijayaraghavendra. The film stars Shiva, Bobby Simha and Gaurav  alongside Lakshmi Devy, who besides playing the female lead, had also written the film's screenplay. The soundtrack and background score were composed by newcomer Karthik Acharya, while editing was handled by Richard Kevin.

Popular Audio label Lahari Music  have acquired the audio rights of the film.
Lahari Music, pioneer record label company is making its Re-Entry in to the Tamil music industry with Masala Padam.
The film is distributed by Auraa Cinemas. The film  released on 9 October 2015.

Cast 

 Shiva as Mani (Manikandan)
 Bobby Simha as Amudhan
 Gaurav as Krish
 Lakshmi Devy as Diya
 Reshma Pasupuleti as Reshma
 Arjun Somayajula as Karthik
 Hyde Karty as Hyde
 Harini Ramesh as Harini
 Prasanth Yerramilli as Kevin
 Srini Suryaprakasam as Hari
 Arun Thirumalai as Apser
 Venkat Subha as Producer Raman
 Tiger Garden Thangadurai as Mani's friend
 Nizam as Mani's friend
 Boopal Raj Vaandayar
 Sri Hari
 Murali Satagoppan
 Praveen
 RJ Vijay as himself

Soundtrack

Karthik Acharya has composed the songs and Bgm of this movie.

References

External links
 

2015 action comedy films
Indian action comedy films
2010s Tamil-language films
2015 films
2015 comedy films
2010s masala films